John Okoye Ebuka (born 12 November 1996) is a Nigerian football forward playing for Al Ahly.

Career
Ebuka made his official debut for Novi Pazar in the 15th fixture of 2015–16 Serbian SuperLiga under coach Mladen Dodić in away lost against Radnik Surdulica, played on 24 October 2015.

He signed in summer of 2016 with Yenicami Ağdelen S.K. in the KTFF Süper Lig and at winter-break, his team were the league leaders and Okoye Ebuka was the league top-scorer with 21 goals.

His goalscoring skills continued the following season, and in 2016–17 he scored 41 goals.

Honours

Club
Yenicami ASK
KTFF Süper Lig: 2016–17, 2017–18

Personal
KTFF Süper Lig top-scorer: 2016–17 (41 goals), 2017–18 (33 goals)

Career statistics

References

External links
 
 John Okoye Ebuka stats at utakmica.rs 
 

Living people
1996 births
Association football forwards
Nigerian footballers
Nigerian expatriate footballers
Nigerian expatriate sportspeople in Serbia
Expatriate footballers in Serbia
FK Novi Pazar players
Serbian SuperLiga players
Expatriate footballers in Northern Cyprus